Argelia is a town and municipality in the Cauca Department, Colombia.

Founded by Order No. 02 on November 3, 1967, the municipality covers an area of 713 km2 and has a population of around 20,000. The population is primarily engaged in agriculture.

References

Municipalities of Cauca Department